Lauricocha (in hispanicized spelling) or Lawriqucha (Quechua for "bluish lake") may refer to:

Lakes 
 Lake Lauricocha, in Huánuco, Peru
 Lauricocha (Ancash), in the Ancash Region, Peru

Rivers 
 Lawriqucha River

Places 
Lauricocha Province, a province in Peru
Lauricocha (Huánuco), a village in Peru
Lauricocha Culture, a sequence of cultural periods of Peru in the Huánuco area

Others 
Margos-yarowilca-lauricocha - a language spoken by ca 80,000 Margos Chaulan Quechua in Peru